HMS Peregrine is the name of two ships of the Royal Navy
 , a sloop-of-war that foundered in the English Channel in 1761
 , an  launched in 1916 and sold in 1921.

See also
 HM Prison Ford, an early name of for part of the facilities was HMS Peregrine.

Royal Navy ship names